Gökhan Değirmenci (born 21 March 1989) is a Turkish professional footballer who plays as a goalkeeper for Kocaelispor.

He was also a youth international, earning caps at the U-18, U-19, and U-21 levels.

References

External links
 
 
 

1989 births
People from Karşıyaka
Living people
Turkish footballers
Turkey B international footballers
Turkey under-21 international footballers
Turkey youth international footballers
Association football goalkeepers
Altay S.K. footballers
Kayserispor footballers
Kayseri Erciyesspor footballers
Göztepe S.K. footballers
Gaziantepspor footballers
Boluspor footballers
Akhisarspor footballers
Bandırmaspor footballers
Kocaelispor footballers
Süper Lig players
TFF First League players
TFF Second League players